The Dietmar-Hopp-Stadion is a football ground in Hoffenheim, Baden-Württemberg, Germany. The 6,350-capacity stadium is the home of 1899 Hoffenheim II and the Hoffenheim women's section. It had been home to the Hoffenheim senior men's side until their promotion to the First Bundesliga for 2008–09. It is named after SAP SE co-founder and 1899 Hoffenheim chairman, Dietmar Hopp.

As the stadium does not meet the standards for the First Bundesliga, it has been replaced by the Rhein-Neckar Arena.

External links
 Page on official TSG 1899 site
 The Dietmar-Hopp-Stadion at StadiumDB.com

Football venues in Germany
TSG 1899 Hoffenheim
Buildings and structures in Rhein-Neckar-Kreis
Sports venues in Baden-Württemberg